Meciadanol is a synthetic O-methylated flavanol. It is the 3-O-methylation of catechin.

It inhibits histidine decarboxylase in rats.

References

Flavanols
Catechols
Resorcinols
Histidine decarboxylase inhibitors